The Party of German-speaking Belgians (PDB) was a regionalist political party active in the German-speaking Community of Belgium founded in 1971. The party was a founder member of the European Free Alliance in 1981.

The party has been accused of supporting irredentism and was involved in a scandal surrounding  which itself had ties to far-right groups.

In 2008 the party was succeeded by ProDG.

References

Political parties in the German-speaking Community of Belgium
1971 establishments in Belgium
2008 disestablishments in Belgium
Political parties established in 1971
Political parties disestablished in 2008
Defunct political parties in Belgium
European Free Alliance
Christian democratic parties in Belgium
German nationalist political parties
Nationalist parties in Belgium